Helmut Friedrich Lachenmann (born 27 November 1935) is a German composer of contemporary classical music. His work has been associated with "instrumental musique concrète".

Life and works 
Lachenmann was born in Stuttgart and after the end of the Second World War (when he was 11) started singing in his local church choir. Showing an early aptitude for music, he was already composing in his teens. He studied piano with Jürgen Uhde and composition and theory with Johann Nepomuk David at the Musikhochschule Stuttgart from 1955 to 1958 and was the first private student of the Italian composer Luigi Nono in Venice from 1958 to 1960. He also worked briefly at the electronic music studio at the University of Ghent in 1965, composing his only published tape piece Szenario during that period, but thereafter focused almost exclusively on purely instrumental music. The brutality of his music led Francisco Estévez to compare his work to the paintings of Francis Bacon.

Lachenmann has referred to his compositions as musique concrète instrumentale, implying a musical language that embraces the entire sound-world made accessible through unconventional playing techniques. According to the composer, this is music in which the sound events are chosen and organized so that the manner in which they are generated is at least as important as the resultant acoustic qualities themselves. Consequently those qualities, such as timbre, volume, etc., do not produce sounds for their own sake, but describe or denote the concrete situation: listening, you hear the conditions under which a sound- or noise-action is carried out, you hear what materials and energies are involved and what resistance is encountered. 

His music is therefore primarily derived from the most basic of sounds, which through processes of amplification serve as the basis for extended works. His scores place enormous demands on performers, due to the plethora of techniques that he has invented for wind, brass and string instruments.

His more important works include his opera Das Mädchen mit den Schwefelhölzern (The Little Match Girl) (1990–96, after Hans Christian Andersen, Leonardo da Vinci and Gudrun Ensslin), the orchestral pieces Schwankungen am Rand (1974–75, for eight brass, two electric guitars, two pianos, four thunder sheets, and 34 strings), Accanto (1975–76, for clarinet, large orchestra and tape) and NUN (1997–99, for flute, trombone, male chorus, and large orchestra), the ensemble works Mouvement (- vor der Erstarrung) (1982–84, for three ad hoc players and 14 players) and "...zwei Gefühle...", Musik mit Leonardo (1992, (later incorporated in opera Das Mädchen mit den Schwefelhölzern), after Leonardo da Vinci, for two speakers and 22 players) and three string quartets (Gran Torso, 1971, revised 1976, 1988; Reigen seliger Geister, 1989; Grido, 2001), as well as other orchestral, ensemble and chamber works and six piano pieces.

He has regularly lectured at the Darmstadt New Music Summer School since 1978. From 1976 to 1981 he taught music theory, ear training and composition at the Musikhochschule Hannover, from 1981 to 1999 composition at the Musikhochschule Stuttgart. 

He is also noted for his articles, essays and lectures, many of which appear in Musik als existentielle Erfahrung (Music as Existential Experience) (Breitkopf & Härtel, Wiesbaden, 1996).

Lachenmann has received many distinguished awards such as the Bach Prize of the Free and Hanseatic City of Hamburg in 1972, the Ernst von Siemens Music Prize in 1997 and the 2010 BBVA Foundation Frontiers of Knowledge Award in the Contemporary Music Category.

He is married to Japanese pianist Yukiko Sugawara.

List of works 

The list below is sourced from Breitkopf & Härtel, Lachenmann's publisher.

 Fünf Variationen über ein Thema von Franz Schubert (German Dance in C-sharp minor, D643) for piano (1956)
 Rondo for two pianos (1957)
 Souvenir for 41 instruments (1959)
 Due Giri, two studies for orchestra (1960)
 Tripelsextett for 18 instruments (1960–61, lost)
 Fünf Strophen for 9 instruments (1961, withdrawn)
 Echo Andante for piano (1961–62)
 Angelion for 16 instruments (1962–63, withdrawn)
 Wiegenmusik for piano (1963)
 Introversion I for 18 instruments (1963, withdrawn)
 Introversion II for 8 instruments (1964. withdrawn)
 Scenario for tape (1965)
 Streichtrio I for violin, viola and cello (1965)
 Intérieur I for one percussionist (1966)
 Notturno for small orchestra and solo cello (1966/67)
 Trio fluido for clarinet, viola and percussion (1966/68)
 Consolations I for 12 voices and percussion (1967)
 temA for flute, voice and cello (1968)
 Consolations II for 16 voices (1968)
 Air, music for large orchestra with percussion solo (1968–69)
 Pression for cello (1969–70, revised 2010)
 Dal niente (Interieur III) for clarinet (1970)
 Guero, piano study (1970)
 Kontrakadenz for large orchestra (1970–71)
 Montage for clarinet, cello and piano (1971)
 Klangschatten – mein Saitenspiel for three Konzertflügel (pianoforte) and string ensemble (1972)
 Gran Torso, music for string quartet (1972)
 Fassade for large orchestra (1973)
 Schwankungen am Rand, for sheet metal and strings (1974–75)
 Zwei Studien for violin (1974)
 Accanto, music for solo clarinet and orchestra (1975–76)
 Les Consolations for choir and orchestra (1976–78)
 Salut für Caudwell, music for two guitarists (1977)
 Tanzsuite mit Deutschlandlied, music for orchestra and string quartet (1979–80)
 Ein Kinderspiel, seven little pieces for piano (1980)
 Harmonica, music for large orchestra and solo tuba (1981–83)
 Mouvement (- vor der Erstarrung) for ensemble (1982/84)
 Ausklang for piano and orchestra (1984–85)
 Dritte Stimme zu J. S. Bachs zweistimmiger Invention d-moll BWV 775 for three instruments (1985)
 Staub for orchestra (1985–87)
 Toccatina, violin study (1986)
 Allegro sostenuto, music for clarinet, cello and piano (1986–88)
 Tableau for orchestra (1988)
 Reigen seliger Geister, string quartet (1989)
 "...zwei Gefühle...", Musik mit Leonardo for speaker and ensemble (1992)
 Das Mädchen mit den Schwefelhölzern Musik mit Bildern (Musiktheater), music with images – theatre music for very large orchestra and soloists (1988–96)
 Serynade for piano (1998)
 NUN for flute, trombone, male choir and orchestra (1999)
 Sakura-Variationen for saxophone, percussion and piano (2000)
 3. Streichquartett "Grido", string quartet (2001)
 Schreiben for orchestra (2003)
 Double (Grido II) for string orchestra (2004)
 Concertini for large ensemble (2005)
 ...got lost..., music for soprano and piano (2008)
 Sakura mit Berliner Luft for saxophone, piano and percussion (2008)
 Marche fatale for piano (2016–17)
 Berliner Kirschblüten for piano (2016–17)
 Marche Fatale for orchestra (2017)
 My Melodies for eight horns and orchestra (2012–18)

References

Further reading

An interview with Lachenmann appeared in issue 228 (February 2003) of The Wire
 
 
 
 
 
 
 
 
 
 
Weeks, James. "Liberating Perception and Entering Lion Cages: An Interview with Helmut Lachenmann". New Notes (November 2006).

External links
Interview in new notes magazine. November 2006
Publisher Breitkopf & Härtel page
Living Composers Project (biography, work list, discography)
Helmut Lachenmann's The 'Beautiful' in Music Today
Recording of Lachenmann in conversation about his music, 2008
Helmut Lachenmann website 
 

1935 births
Living people
Musicians from Stuttgart
Harvard University staff
20th-century classical composers
German classical composers
Officers Crosses of the Order of Merit of the Federal Republic of Germany
Recipients of the Order of Merit of Baden-Württemberg
Academic staff of the Conservatoire de Paris
Members of the Academy of Arts, Berlin
Academic staff of the Hochschule für Musik, Theater und Medien Hannover
Pupils of Karlheinz Stockhausen
State University of Music and Performing Arts Stuttgart alumni
German male classical composers
20th-century German composers
Ernst von Siemens Music Prize winners
20th-century German male musicians